Dawane Wallace (born October 13, 1976) is an American track and field hurdler who competed in the 110-meter hurdles. He was a bronze medallist at the 1999 Summer Universiade and a finalist at the 2001 World Championships in Athletics. His personal record is 13.22 seconds – a time he achieved on four occasions.

Collegiately he competed for the University of Tennessee's Tennessee Volunteers track team. He also competed at the 2001 Goodwill Games and 2001 IAAF Grand Prix Final.

International competitions

Personal records
110-meter hurdles – 13.22 (2000)
100-meter dash – 10.52 (2002)
200-meter dash – 21.34 (1999)
Indoors
55-meter dash – 6.40 (2001)
60-meter dash – 6.86 (2004)
200-meter dash – 21.77 (2003)
400-meter dash – 48.89 (1999)
50-meter hurdles – 6.59 (2001)
55-meter hurdles – 7.13 (2000)
60-meter hurdles – 7.58 (2002)
All information from All-Athletics.

References

External links

Living people
1976 births
American male hurdlers
World Athletics Championships athletes for the United States
Tennessee Volunteers men's track and field athletes
Universiade medalists in athletics (track and field)
Universiade bronze medalists for the United States
Medalists at the 1999 Summer Universiade
Competitors at the 2001 Goodwill Games